Sophie Wright  is an Australian musical theatre and screen actress, and a graduate of the Western Australian Academy of Performing Arts. Wright made her professional music theatre debut in 2013 in the Australasian production of Wicked, as the Elphaba cover and in the ensemble. Other notable works are a featured performer in Hugh Jackman's Broadway to Oz (2015), Kate Monster/Lucy in the Melbourne production of Avenue Q (2016), Lauren in the Australian premiere of Kinky Boots (2016-2017) and Angela Black in the Australian television comedy series Mr Black (2018-2019) starring Stephen Curry, Nadine Garner, Nicholas Russell and Paul Denny, on Network 10. In 2017 she was judged by the Age newspaper to be No 6 of "Meet the Aussie stars to watch "

Biography 
Born in Sydney, NSW.

Wright was accepted into WAAPA's Bachelor of Music Theatre degree, graduating in 2011.  Following WAAPA, Wright played the role of Nicole Woodlowe in Monster Pictures horror thriller movie The Butcher Possessions (originally named ‘Beckoning the Butcher’) and as Lana in LAD Feature Film Pty Ltd Is This the Real World?

In 2013, Wright made her professional music theatre debut in the Broadway musical Wicked (2013-2015) as the Elphaba cover touring New Zealand, Philippines and Australia. Following Wicked, Wright joined the ensemble cast of Hugh Jackman's concert arena Broadway to Oz (2015) touring nationally.

Other credits include, Song Contest – The Almost Eurovision Experience, as Young Sally in Follies in Concert and as Kate Monster and Lucy in Avenue Q (Prince Moo Productions).

Wright was the original Australian Lauren in the Australian premiere of Kinky Boots (the Michael Cassell Group) in 2016–17. She was nominated for a Helpmann Award  "Best Female Actor in a Musical" in 2017 She also played the role of June and Mazeppa in the Hayes Theatre/Luckiest Production of Gypsy.

Wright also plays Angela Black in the new comedy television series Mr Black, to be seen on Network 10 in 2019 alongside Stephen Curry, Nadine Garner, Nicholas Russell and Paul Denny.

Personal life 
Other than performing, Wright's main interest is the psychology and mindset of performers and creative people.

Stage Credits

Television

Film

Stage

Awards

References 

Living people
1990 births
Australian stage actresses
Australian film actresses
Australian television actresses